The Conestoga was a launch vehicle design funded by Space Services Inc. of America (SSIA) of Houston, Texas.  Conestoga originally consisted of surplus LGM-30 Minuteman stages with additional strap-on boosters, as required for larger payloads. It was the world's first privately funded commercial rocket, but was launched only three times (once as a modified design) before the program was shut down.

Percheron
SSIA had originally intended to use a design by Gary Hudson, Percheron, which was intended to dramatically lower the price of space launches. Key to the design was a simple pressure-fed kerosene-oxidizer engine that was intended to reduce the cost of the expendable booster. Various loads could be accommodated by clustering the basic modules together. SSIA conducted an engine test firing of the Percheron on Matagorda Island on August 5, 1981, but the rocket exploded due to a malfunction. SSIA then asked Hudson to become head of R&D at SSIA, but because they wished to focus on solid fuel rockets, he declined.

Conestoga 1

SSIA founder David Hannah then hired Deke Slayton, one of the original Mercury Seven astronauts. Slayton had just left NASA after running the Space Shuttle Landing and Approach validation testing (among earlier roles). SSIA purchased an Aries research rocket from Space Vector, Inc., which was developed for the U.S. Navy and NASA using the second stage of the Minuteman missile. The first launch of the new Conestoga I design took place on 9 Sep 1982, consisting of the core missile stage and a 500 kg dummy payload which included 40 gallons of water. The payload was successfully ejected at 313 km, and the Conestoga I became the first privately funded rocket to reach space.

SSIA launched a second rocket in 1989, a Black Brant sounding rocket which they referred to as Starfire, to provide commercial support for microgravity experiments.

Conestoga 1620

SSIA was purchased by EER Systems in December 1990. The design was modified again, this time using Castor engines like those used on the Scout, a workhorse of the 1960s. The new design was known as the Conestoga with a four-digit number following it indicating the arrangement of the boosters.

In May 1990 the Center for Space Transportation and Applied Research (CSTAR) pitched to NASA their Commercial Experiment Transporter (COMET) payload concept, a low-cost standardized bus with both sub-orbital and orbital components. Mission duration for the COMET would be longer than for existing sounding rockets, and the orbital portion would be free-flight and not disturbed by crew movement as it was on the Space Shuttle. Westinghouse agreed to provide the bus and "service module," Space Industries Inc. built the re-entry module, and EER was contracted to provide several Conestoga launchers.

The entire COMET program quickly ran into delays and budget overruns, and it was not until the end of the program that a COMET (now known as METEOR) and Conestoga 1620 were finally ready for launch. The satellite payload included a number of experiments, including material (evaluation of exposure to the harsh space environment) and biological (assessment of seed reaction to micro-gravity; growth fluids were to be injected into the seed containers after launch), as well as GPS/radar correlation tracking.  The satellite included a recoverable section that was to separate on command after several weeks in orbit, fire a small internal retro-motor, and descend for recovery off the Virginia coast.

The launch took place from a clamshell gantry, which included power and environmental control, at the south end of Wallops Flight Facility on 23 October 1995; the rocket launched normally, but broke up 46 seconds into the flight. EER determined that an unknown source of low frequency noise had caused the guidance system to order course corrections when none were needed, causing the steering mechanism to eventually run out of hydraulic fluid. NASA had already decided to deny further funding, due to the original delays, and EER subsequently got out of the rocket business.

The remaining assets were purchased by L-3 Communications in 2001 for $110 million.

Conestoga versions
Due to the modular design of the Conestoga, a large number of configurations were possible. The version number encoded the configuration:
 the first digit encoded the type of booster motor
 the second digit was the number of booster motors clustered around the core
 the third digit encoded the type of the first upper stage
 the fourth digit encoded the type of the second upper stage

Launch history

See also
List of orbital launch systems
List of space launch system designs
List of rockets
Timeline of private spaceflight

References

Rockets and missiles
Expendable space launch systems